Crockett is a city and the county seat of Houston County, Texas, United States. As of the 2020 census, the city population was 6,332. Houston County is the oldest county and Crockett the fifth-oldest city in Texas.

History 

The town was named after Davy Crockett, who had camped nearby on his way to the Alamo; the site was very near the Old San Antonio Road. Andrew Edwards Gossett, a Texas Revolution soldier from Maury, Tennessee, along with his father and brother, donated the land for the town in 1836, and named it after Crockett, whom they had previously known. The town was incorporated in 1837, and a post office was granted the following year. Crockett was connected to Nacogdoches by stage service. In 1839 raids by the Alabama-Coushatta and Cherokee Indians forced the town's residents to take shelter in the fortified log courthouse. Crockett was a training center for Confederate conscripts during the Civil War.

The railroad came through in 1872, enabling Crockett to exploit the county's timber resources. By 1885 the town was thriving with a population of 1,200, and the following year a school was opened for black girls. It evolved into Mary Allen Junior College, which operated into the 1970s. In 1904 lignite mining started, peaking about 1910. The stands of timber were seriously depleted by the 1920s. The population was over 3,000 in the mid-1920s, and by 1936 it was nearly 4,500. The population of Crockett increased while most of East Texas declined after World War II. It had reached 5,000 by the 1960 census.

During this time, one of the first loop roads in the nation (Loop 304) was built around the city. This traffic reliever was procured through the works of heavyweight politicians who called Crockett home. Blues singer Lightnin' Hopkins was once arrested in Crockett. In recent years, the economy of Crockett has expanded with the construction of new retail space on Loop 304. Several historic buildings in downtown have been renovated to accommodate new office and service space. Renewed interest in reserves of natural gas in the surrounding area has led to construction of energy infrastructure and receipt of royalty revenues for land.

In 1854, A.T. Monroe, a grandnephew of U.S. President James Monroe, came to Crockett from Virginia. He established what is now the Monroe-Crook House, built with brick placed between the inner and outer walls. George W. Crook purchased the residence in 1911. The house, open for public tours, is located in front of the John H. Wooters Public Library in the same block as the Crockett Presbyterian Church. The Presbyterian Church was established in 1854. The building was razed by a fire in 1926 and rebuilt.

Government and infrastructure
The United States Postal Service operates the Crockett Post Office.

The Texas Youth Commission operated the Crockett State School in Crockett. However, the facility closed on or around August 31, 2011 and is no longer in operation.

History was made in Crockett on Monday, May 13, 2019, as Dr. Ianthia Fisher became the first African-American female to be sworn in as the city's mayor.

Geography

Crockett is located near the center of Houston County at  (31.317010, –95.458397). Several highways converge on the city. U.S. Route 287 leads north  to Palestine and southeast  to Corrigan. Texas State Highway 21 leads northeast  to Alto and southwest  to Madisonville at Interstate 45. State Highway 7 leads east  to Nacogdoches and west  to Centerville along I-45. State Highway 19 leads south from Crockett  to Huntsville.

The city is within the Trinity River watershed, with the north side of the city draining toward Hurricane Bayou, which joins the Trinity River west of Crockett, and the south side draining toward Gail Creek, a tributary of White Rock Creek, which joins the Trinity at Lake Livingston.

The terrain of the town is hilly, and (as with many East Texas towns) contains significant forest, mostly loblolly pine and pecan trees.

Demographics

As of the 2020 United States census, there were 6,332 people, 2,560 households, and 1,421 families residing in the city.

As of the census of 2000,  7,141 people, 2,672 households, and 1,747 families were residing in the city. The population density was 805.6 people/sq mi (311.2/km2). The 3,081 housing units averaged 347.6/sq mi (134.3/km2). The racial makeup of the city was 48.54% White, 44.67% African American, 0.36% Native American, 0.46% Asian, 0.14% Pacific Islander, 4.78% from other races, and 1.05% from two or more races. Hispanics or Latinos of any race were 10.50% of the population.

Of the 2,672 households, 31.1% had children under the age of 18 living with them, 38.5% were married couples] living together, 23.3% had a female householder with no husband present, and 34.6% were not families. About 31.3% of all households were made up of individuals, and 16.7% had someone living alone who was 65 years of age or older. The average household size was 2.46, and the average family size was 3.08.

In the city, the age distribution was 29.8% under 18, 8.9% from 18 to 24, 23.1% from 25 to 44, 19.2% from 45 to 64, and 18.9% who were 65  or older. The median age was 35 years. For every 100 females, there were 85.5 males. For every 100 females age 18 and over, there were 75.5 males.

The median income for a household in the city was $21,455, and for a family was $27,069. Males had a median income of $26,098 versus $18,674 for females. The per capita income for the city was $11,708. About 26.6% of families and 33.9% of the population were below the poverty line, including 44.6% of those under age 18 and 26.0% of those age 65 or over. Crockett is one of the poorest cities in the United States.

Education

Public schools
Most of the city is served by the Crockett Independent School District, although a few acres of the city limits are within the Latexo Independent School District.

Private schools

Crockett is home to the Jordan School—a private, co-educational institution operated by the local Episcopal Church. It currently serves prekindergarten and kindergarten levels. They have partnered with Vista Academy, a charter school operated by Responsive Education Solutions based in Lewisville, Texas, which serves grades 1–6.

Notable people

 John Arledge, actor
 Les Beasley, gospel music performer
 Jerald Clark, retired Major League Baseball player (San Diego Padres)
 Phil Clark, retired Major League Baseball player, coach of the Detroit Tigers AA team
 Ja'Gared Davis, NFL and CFL football player
 Myrtis Dightman, champion rodeo bull rider
 Jamie Easterly, pitcher for the Atlanta Braves (1974–1979), Milwaukee Brewers (1981–1983), and Cleveland Indians (1983–1987)
 Edd Hargett, former quarterback for Texas A&M University, who went on to play professionally for the NFL's New Orleans Saints and Houston Oilers
 Sam Hinton, folk music singer
 Eugene Lockhart, Dallas Cowboys linebacker from the 1980s
 Cartier Martin, former NBA and international basketball player born in Crockett
 Rain Phoenix, actress, musician, and singer born in Crockett
 River Phoenix, actor, lived in Crockett
 Claude Riley, retired basketball player
 Kenny Rogers, country music singer
 Lucille Elizabeth Bishop Smith (1892–1985), entrepreneur, chef, and inventor born in Crockett
 Jim Turner, former U.S. representative from Texas, Democrat
 Joe Washington, NFL player born in Crockett

Climate
The climate in this area is characterized by hot, humid summers and generally mild to cool winters.  According to the Köppen climate classification, Crockett has a humid subtropical climate, Cfa on climate maps.

References

External links

 City of Crockett official website
 Houston County and Crockett Area Chamber of Commerce
 Discover Crockett Texas tourism website

County seats in Texas
Cities in Texas
Cities in Houston County, Texas
Davy Crockett
1837 establishments in the Republic of Texas